The optokinetic response (OKR) is a combination of a slow-phase and fast-phase eye movements. It is seen when an individual tracks (pursuit movement) a moving object with their eyes, which then moves out of the field of vision, a point at which their eyes move back to the initial position (saccade movement) when they first saw the object. The reflex develops at about 6 months of age.

Optokinetic nystagmus/response (OKN/R) is nystagmus that occurs in response to a visual stimulus on the retina. It is present in normally developed patients. The optokinetic response allows the eye to follow objects in motion when the head remains stationary (e.g., observing individual telephone poles on the side of the road as one travels by them in a car, or observing stationary objects while walking past them).

Diagnosis

Eliciting optokinetic nystagmus
With normal vision, an OKN response develops in infants and remains through adulthood. The OKN response consists of initial slow phases in the direction of the stimulus (smooth pursuits), followed by fast, corrective phases (return saccade). Presence of an OKN response in the temporal to nasal direction indicates an intact visual pathway.
Another effective method is to hold a mirror in front of the patient and slowly rotate the mirror to either side of the patient. The patient with an intact visual pathway will maintain eye contact with themselves. This compelling optokinetic stimulus forces reflex slow eye movements.

Stereopsis development
This is particularly helpful in infantile strabismus to determine if motion stereopsis development is present or not. Nasal to temporal motion tracking can be trained in infantile strabismus allowing for eye alignment (Baxtrom and Clopton, 2019) and may be associated with the Accessory Optic System for eye control.

See also
Eye movement
Nystagmus
Reflex
Saccadic masking

References

External links
 Optokinetic nystagmus testing

Visual system
Vision
Articles containing video clips